Yevgeny "Jenia" Berkman (born September 29, 1991) is an Israeli footballer who plays as a defender for Hapoel Nof HaGalil.

Career
Berkman played for Hapoel Nazareth Illit youth teams, serving as captain in each age group. He had graduated to the senior team in 2010, playing for the club ever since. In summer 2014 Berkman trialed with Premier League club Hapoel Petah Tikva, but the move fell through and Berkman stayed with Nazareth Illit.

Berkman played one match for the Israel U-21 team, against Albania.

References

External links
 

1991 births
Living people
Israeli Jews
Israeli footballers
Hapoel Kfar Saba F.C. players
Hapoel Nof HaGalil F.C. players
Liga Leumit players
Israeli Premier League players
Footballers from Nof HaGalil
Association football defenders